Jow-e Pain (also Romanized as Jow-e Pā’īn, Jowpā’īn, and Jūpa’īn) is a village in Bizaki Rural District, Golbajar District, Chenaran County, Razavi Khorasan Province, Iran. At the 2006 census, its population was 134, in 30 families.

References 

Populated places in Chenaran County